Recantation means  a personal  public act of denial of a previously published  opinion or belief. It is derived from the Latin "re cantare", to re-sing.

Philosophy
Philosophically recantation is linked to a genuine change of opinion, often caused by a serious event which reveals a better or more complete representation of a presumed truth. For example, Retractationes was the title of a 5th-century book by Bishop Augustine of Hippo correcting his former writings as an ordinary teacher of  rhetoric prior to his becoming a cleric which he described as "a recantation of opinion with admission of error".

In classical Roman poetry, after deliberately describing something extravagantly or  hyperbolically for memorable dramatic effect, recantation was used to briefly redefine the material subject fairly and honestly.

Religion
Religiously recantation may be required to avoid punishment or imposed to obtain pardon from a sin such as
 Heresy (wrong choice)  which means questioning or doubting dogmatic established beliefs
 Blasphemy (evil-speaking) which is the act of insulting or showing contempt for a religious deity.
 Apostasy which implies  either revolt against or renunciation or abandonment of a prescribed religious duty, especially disloyalty sedition and defection

In Protestantism, recantation may be requested by or  ordered from an ecclesiastical authority such as a synod or ecumenical council

In the Roman Catholic Church, the Inquisition, Holy Office, or even on rare occasion the contemporary Congregation for the Doctrine of the Faith required an act of renunciation to enforce an orthodoxy.

In a secular state if ordered to recant by religious authority, one who refused to recant may be anathematized or excommunicated or subject to social exclusion.

In a theocracy an order to recant may include threats of physical punishment such as prison or corporal punishment which may include death or lethal cruelty such as the  burning at the stake suffered by  Jeanne d'Arc.

See also

 revocation.

Belief